Edward William Mattner,  (16 September 1893 – 21 December 1977) was an Australian politician and soldier who served as a Senator for South Australia from 1944 to 1946 and 1950 to 1968. He was President of the Senate from 1951 to 1953.

Early life
Born in Oakbank, South Australia, he was educated at Adelaide High School and then the University of Adelaide, before becoming a farmer at Balhannah. He served in the Australian Imperial Force from 1915 to 1919, during which he was awarded the Military Cross, Distinguished Conduct Medal and Military Medal for heroism on the Western Front, and with the Second Australian Imperial Force from 1941 to 1942, acting as second-in-command of the 13th Field Regiment in New Guinea.

Politics

In 1944, he was appointed to the Australian Senate as a United Australia Party Senator for South Australia, filling the casual vacancy caused by the resignation of Oliver Uppill. Soon after his appointment, the UAP became the Liberal Party. Defeated in an attempt at re-election in 1946, he returned to the Senate in 1949. On 12 June 1951, he was elected President of the Senate, a position he held until 7 September 1953, when he was succeeded by Alister McMullin. He held his Senate seat until his retirement in 1967. Mattner died in 1977.

References

 

1893 births
1977 deaths
Australian Army officers
Australian military personnel of World War I
Australian military personnel of World War II
Liberal Party of Australia members of the Parliament of Australia
Members of the Australian Senate
Members of the Australian Senate for South Australia
Presidents of the Australian Senate
Australian recipients of the Distinguished Conduct Medal
Australian recipients of the Military Cross
Australian recipients of the Military Medal
United Australia Party members of the Parliament of Australia
University of Adelaide alumni
Sturt Football Club players
20th-century Australian politicians
South Australian politicians
Military personnel from South Australia
People educated at Adelaide High School